Laure Pequegnot (born 30 September 1975) is a French former Alpine skier.

She was born in Échirolles, Isère. She won a total of 3 Alpine skiing World Cup races, all in the slalom discipline.  She became world junior champion in slalom, in 1994.  She won World Cup discipline title, in slalom, in 2002.  She competed at three Winter Olympics, winning a silver medal in the Slalom event at the 2002 Salt Lake City Olympics.

World Cup victories

References

1975 births
Living people
People from Échirolles
French female alpine skiers
Olympic silver medalists for France
Alpine skiers at the 1998 Winter Olympics
Alpine skiers at the 2002 Winter Olympics
Alpine skiers at the 2006 Winter Olympics
Olympic alpine skiers of France
Olympic medalists in alpine skiing
FIS Alpine Ski World Cup champions
Medalists at the 2002 Winter Olympics
Université Savoie-Mont Blanc alumni
Sportspeople from Isère